Somm may refer to:
 Somm, a shortened reference for sommelier, a trained and knowledgeable wine professional
 SOMM (film), a documentary about the Master Sommelier examination